Baccharis halimifolia is a North American species of shrubs in the family Asteraceae. It is native to Nova Scotia, the eastern and southern United States (from Massachusetts south to Florida and west to Texas and Oklahoma), eastern Mexico (Nuevo León, San Luis Potosí, Tamaulipas, Veracruz, Quintana Roo), the Bahamas, and Cuba.

Widely used common names include eastern baccharis, groundsel bush, sea myrtle, and saltbush, with consumption weed, cotton-seed tree, groundsel tree, menguilié, and silverling also used more locally.  In most of its range, where no other species of the genus occur, this plant is often simply called baccharis.

Classification

Baccharis halimifola was first described and named by Carl Linnaeus in his Species Plantarum, published in 1753.  No subspecies or varieties are recognized within the species.

This species is the northernmost member of the large Western Hemisphere genus Baccharis in the aster family (Asteraceae).

Senecio arborescens, a Neotropical species, was confused with Baccharis halimifolia in the past.

Description

Baccharis halimifolia is a fall-flowering  shrub growing to about 12 ft (4 m) high and comparably wide, or occasionally a small tree.  Its simple, alternate, thick, egg-shaped to rhombic leaves mostly have coarse teeth, with the uppermost leaves entire.  These fall-flowering Baccharis plants are dioecious, with male and female flowers on separate individuals.  Their flowers are borne in numerous small, compact heads in large leafy terminal inflorescences, with the snowy-white, cotton-like female flower-heads showy and conspicuous at a distance.

The species is sometimes confused with the marsh-elder (Iva frutescens), with which it often co-occurs, but the Baccharis has its leaves alternate, while those of the Iva are opposite.

Ecology
Baccharis halimifolia, usually found in wetlands, is unusually salt-tolerant, and often found along salty or brackish shores of marshes and estuaries, and the inland shores of coastal barrier islands. In Florida, it is also found along ditches, in old fields, and in other disturbed areas. Other habitats in the northeastern United States include freshwater tidal marshes and open woods and thickets along the seacoast.

The flowers produce abundant nectar that attracts various butterflies, including the monarch (Danaus plexippus). These dense shrubs also provide wildlife food and cover.

Invasiveness

The species has become naturalized in Europe and in New Zealand and considered invasive.

The species features since 2016 on the list of Invasive Alien Species of Union Concern. This means that import of the species and trade in the species is forbidden in the whole of the European Union.

In Australia, B. halimifolia is an invasive species along the coast of southern Queensland and New South Wales.  As biological control the rust fungus Puccinia evadens is used.
Furthermore, the lepidoptera Hellinsia balanotes (Meyrick, 1908), Aristotelia ivae Busck, 1900, Lorita baccharivora Pogue, 1988 and Prochoerodes truxaliata (Guenée, 1858) were released for its biological control.

In the northeastern United States, the species has become common well inland of the shrub's natural range along various major highways where road salt is heavily used, sometimes forming conspicuous displays when flowering in the fall, as along I-95 in Howard County, Maryland.

Toxicity
The seeds of Baccharis halimifolia are toxic to humans.

Uses
Baccharis halimifolia is occasionally cultivated and is considered useful as a hedge or border as well as a specimen plant.
In southern Louisiana, it has been traditionally used as a medicine to treat inflamed kidneys and fever.

References

Other references

Niering, William, Olmstead, Nancy, National Audubon Society Field Guide to North American Wildflowers Eastern Region, 1995, p. 367

External links

Trees, Shrubs, and Woody Vines of North Carolina: Groundseltree, Eastern Baccharis (Baccharis halimifolia)

halimifolia
Flora of North America
Plants described in 1753
Taxa named by Carl Linnaeus
Medicinal plants of North America